The James O'Connor Three-Decker is a historic triple-decker in Worcester, Massachusetts.  At time of its listing on the National Register of Historic Places in 1990, it was recognized as a well-preserved example of a wood-frame Queen Anne building, featuring a three-story porch with decorative turned wood balusters and porch supports, and wood siding with decorative bands of cut shingles.  It was built about 1906, in what was then an ethnically mixed neighborhood; its early occupants were Irish and Swedish, with Poles and Lithuanians arriving later.  Since its listing, the house has been resided and the porches removed.

See also
National Register of Historic Places listings in southwestern Worcester, Massachusetts
National Register of Historic Places listings in Worcester County, Massachusetts

References

Apartment buildings in Worcester, Massachusetts
Apartment buildings on the National Register of Historic Places in Massachusetts
Queen Anne architecture in Massachusetts
Houses completed in 1906
Triple-decker apartment houses
National Register of Historic Places in Worcester, Massachusetts
1906 establishments in Massachusetts